Battle of the Himera River may refer to:

 Battle of the Himera River (311 BC)
 Battle of the Himera River (446 BC)